Examples of yellowface mainly include the portrayal of East Asians in American film and theater, though this can also encompass other Western media. It used to be the norm in Hollywood that East Asian characters were played by white actors, often using makeup to approximate East Asian facial characteristics, a practice known as yellowface.

American media portrayals of East Asians have reflected a dominant Americentric perception rather than realistic and authentic depictions of true cultures, customs and behaviors. Yellowface relies on stereotypes of East Asians in the United States.

Fu Manchu, Charlie Chan, and Madame Butterfly 

 Fu Manchu and Charlie Chan were the most common East Asian characters in film and television of the mid-20th century, and they were almost always played by white actors in yellowface. (Swedish actor Warner Oland, the first Charlie Chan in sound films, did not use yellowface. He was considered to look Asian, and was typecast in such roles from early in his career.) An updated film version of Charlie Chan was planned in the 1990s by Miramax; this new Charlie Chan was to be "hip, slim, cerebral, sexy and ... a martial-arts master", but the film did not come to fruition.
 Madame Butterfly, an opera about a Japanese woman who falls in love with an American sailor who leaves her, and when he returns with an American wife, the devastated Cio-Cio San commits suicide. This immensely popular opera is often performed with a non-East Asian singer playing the role of Cio-Cio San.

Before the Civil Rights Movement

After the Civil Rights Movement 
Note: This is also after the anti-miscegenation laws were repealed in the United States of America that prevented East Asian actors from playing opposite white actors as love interests.

21st century

Yellowface worn by a character in a film 
In some films, white characters, played by white actors, have played East Asians, often as a disguise.

Books about yellowface 

 Made-Up Asians: Yellowface During the Exclusion Era (2022) by Esther Kim  - provides history and examples of yellowface

See also 
 Chung Ling Soo, stage name of white American magician William Ellsworth Robinson
 Ghost Bath, an American black metal band who claimed to be from Chongqing, China.
 Michael Derrick Hudson, a white American poet who was accused of "yellowface" for employing a Chinese female pseudonym
 Portrayal of East Asians in American film and theater
 Racebending
 Whitewashing in film

References 

Cultural appropriation
History of racism in the cinema of the United States
Films about race and ethnicity
Race-related controversies
Race-related controversies in film
Race-related controversies in theatre
Casting controversies in film
Stereotypes of Asian Americans
Stereotypes of East Asian people
Ethnic humour